Brian Crosby may refer to:

 Brian Crosby (composer) (born 1973), Irish composer, producer and musician
 Brian Crosby (author), American author, educator, and newspaper columnist
 Brian M. Crosby, American politician in the Maryland House of Delegates